Modestus Fernando SLSR is a retired Lieutenant Colonel of the Sri Lankan Army. He holds a master's degree in Human Rights from the University of Colombo. Having been trained in the Defense Academies of Sri Lanka and Pakistan, he served as Platoon Commander, Company Commander, Detachment Commander and Commander of the 4th Battalion of the Sri Lanka Sinha Regiment. He participated in several military operations against the LTTE such as Operation Riviresa and the Vadamarachchi Operation and is the recipient of a number of awards and military decorations including the Desha Putra Sammanaya (Son of the Nation Award).

Combat related injuries sustained by him, resulted in a major turning point in his career. In the nineties his assignments were in the area of rehabilitation of fellow disabled soldiers. During this period he served as Commanding Officer, Rehabilitation Center-Ragama, Staff Officer attached to the Military Hospital Army Headquarters and subsequently at the Directorate of Rehabilitation (Sri Lanka Army).

During the period 2000 – 2008, as Training Director/Staff Officer I attached to the Directorate of Human Rights, he worked actively for the dissemination of International Humanitarian Law and Human Rights principles and the integration of the same into training modules and operational procedures.

Following his retirement from active service in 2008, Modestus Fernando was appointed Deputy Commissioner General of Rehabilitation at the Bureau of Rehabilitation which was initially under Ministry of Justice and Law Reforms and thereafter under the Ministry of Rehabilitation and Prisons Reform. His duties during this four-year assignment ending in April 2012, focused mainly on formulating and implementing programs for rehabilitation of LTTE ex-combatants, including child soldiers and their integration into family and society.

He has participated actively in broadening national advocacy and promotion of disabled peoples’ rights and contributed to sustained dialogue between all stakeholders. He has kept abreast of developments in this respect and shared his experiences in a number of events both in Sri Lanka and abroad.

He has followed an extensive Training Course on Disarmament, Demobilization and Reintegration in Barcelona, Spain (2009). Modestus Fernando has taught undergraduate courses on trends in International Humanitarian Law and Human Rights at the University of Colombo. He has also been a member of the adjunct faculty of the Defense Institute for International Legal Studies (USA) since 2005 serving as an instructor on counter terrorism training programs.

References

 4th Sinha Regiment Battalion. Sri Lanka Sinha Regiment

https://www.bcgr.gov.lk/news.php?id=120

https://www.dawn.com/news/816449

1963 births
Living people
Sinha Regiment officers